Railway Mixed High School (English Medium) Jolarpet, is a school situated in Jolarpettai, Tirupattur district.
This is the oldest school in jolarpettai town.

This school is one of the oldest school in this area, and celebrated its centenary in the 1990s.

The school has produced good results in the tenth standard public examinations held by the government of Tamil Nadu. The school has produced 100% pass percentage in tenth standard board examinations held in 2015.

References 

Railway schools in India
High schools and secondary schools in Tamil Nadu
Schools in Vellore district
Jolarpet